Génois was a  74-gun ship of the line of the French Navy, of the sub-type of Borée and .

Design and construction 
Designed based on plans by Jacques-Noël Sané, and updated by Maillot, she was the prototype of a new variant of the Téméraire class designed to have a smaller draught, allowing the production of ships of the line in the shallower harbours. Borée was built is Antwerp, and Génois in Genoa.

Construction of Génois was awarded to the shipbuilding company Muzzio and Migone, who botched the launch on 6 August 1805: the ship stopped dead on her launching berth, and her keel hogged. Engineer Forfait was sent to Genoa to save the ship, and managed to launch her properly on 16 August.

Career 
Génois was commissioned under Captain Lhermite on 2 November 1805. She remained in Genoa un 1806, before sailing to Toulon and taking part in the Mediterranean squadron under Vice-Admiral Ganteaume. In early 1808, she sailed from Toulon to Taranto, and took part in expeditions to supply Corfu.

In the spring of 1809, Lhermite was replaced by Captain Montalan, who took command in April, and retain it until Génois was disarmed on 23 June 1814.

In March 1821, under Captain Bénard-Fleury, she ferried food supplies from Toulon to Rochefort.

She was struck and broken up in 1821 in Toulon.

Notes and references

References

Bibliography 
 
 
  
 Fonds Marine. Campagnes (opérations ; divisions et stations navales ; missions diverses). Inventaire de la sous-série Marine BB4. Tome deuxième : BB4 1 à 482 (1790-1826) 

Ships of the line of the French Navy
Téméraire-class ships of the line
1805 ships
Ships built in France